Aberdeen School District may refer to:

Aberdeen School District (Idaho), in Aberdeen, Idaho
Aberdeen School District (Mississippi), in Aberdeen, Mississippi
Aberdeen School District (South Dakota), in Aberdeen, South Dakota
Aberdeen School District (Washington), in Aberdeen, Washington
Matawan-Aberdeen Regional School District, in Matawan, New Jersey